MV Finest is an aluminum-hulled catamaran fast passenger ferry built at Derecktor Shipyards in 1997 for New York Fast Ferry Services. She is owned and operated by Kitsap Transit on a Seattle–Kingston route since 2018. Finest is a former NY Waterway vessel and at one point provided service from the Massachusetts mainland to Martha's Vineyard and Nantucket.

9/11 maritime evacuation

While in service in New York Harbor for New York Fast Ferry Services, Finest participated in the maritime evacuation of Lower Manhattan after the September 11, 2001 World Trade Center attacks. According to her captain, she was the second vessel to arrive at Manhattan to transfer injured people off the island.

Puget Sound service
After her purchase by Kitsap Transit, she was moved through the Panama Canal in February 2018, on the back of another vessel, then overhauled in Washington State for more than $7.5 million.

In early November 2018, Kitsap Transit announced that Finest would begin Kitsap Fast Ferries passenger service on November 26 that year. The state governor visited the ship and terminal at Kingston while attending a ribbon-cutting ceremony on November 19 in advance of scheduled service.

References

External links

 Kitsap Transit fast ferry program official website
 Kitsap Sun Bremerton Beat Blast: Previewing Kingston's new fast ferry Christian Vosler October 30, 2018 (video)
 , October 2018

1996 ships
Ferries of Washington (state)
High-speed craft